The 2009 Judo Grand Slam Rio de Janeiro was held in Rio de Janeiro, Brazil, from 4 to 5 July 2009.

Medal summary

Men's events

Women's events

Source Results

Medal table

References

External links
 

2009 IJF World Tour
2009 Judo Grand Slam
Judo
Judo competitions in Brazil
Judo